WILY (1210 AM) is an American radio station licensed to serve the community of Centralia, Illinois. The station is owned by Dana Withers' Withers Broadcasting Companies, and its broadcast license is held by WRXX, LLC. The station, established in 1946 as "WCNT", was assigned the call sign "WILY" by the Federal Communications Commission (FCC) in 1967.

Programming
WILY broadcasts an oldies music format featuring the "Good Time Oldies" programming from Westwood One. , WILY's on-air personalities include Bruce Chandler in morning drive, JJ McKay on mid-days, Brad Pierce in afternoon drive, Peter McLaine on evenings, and Mike Shaw overnight. WILY also broadcasts a one-hour talk show hosted by Tootie Cooksey each weekday. On Mondays, this is called Talk Time USA and called Hotline on Tuesday through Friday.

Translators
WILY programming is also carried on two broadcast translator stations to extend or improve the coverage area of the station.

References

External links
WILY official website
Withers Broadcasting

ILY
Oldies radio stations in the United States
Marion County, Illinois
Radio stations established in 1946
1946 establishments in Illinois